Mobile Phones Direct Limited is an online-only mobile phone retailer. It sells handsets from leading smartphone brands and airtime contracts from the UK networks Vodafone, O2 and Three. The UK company was founded in 1992 and the its head office is located in Thatcham, Berkshire.

In November 2018, AO World confirmed that it had completed the acquisition of the online phone retailer Mobile Phones Direct Limited for £32.5 million.

In August 2019, Mobile Phones Direct and AO Retail launched a new website called AO Mobile.

In April 2021, the AO Mobile website was moved and Mobile Phones Direct became the sole website offering UK mobile networks and a range of handset manufacturers.

References

Mobile phone companies of the United Kingdom